Eduard Vladimirovich Zagumenny (born 19 February 1973) is a former Russian football player.

References

1973 births
Living people
Russian footballers
FC Tyumen players
Russian Premier League players
Place of birth missing (living people)
Association football defenders